Lior Cole is an American fashion model and Cornell University student. Outside of fashion, she studies artificial intelligence and has developed an app that combines the tenets of Judaism with technology.

Early life and education 
Cole was born in 2001, and grew up in Great Neck, New York on Long Island. She is of Jewish heritage, with an Israeli mother and an American Jewish father; she also has an older sister, Orli. Her name means "my light" in Hebrew. Cole attends Cornell University, studying Information Science and is slated to graduate in 2023, having taken a year off to balance her career endeavors.

Career 
Cole was discovered in Washington Square Park by fashion designer Batsheva Hay. She was then referred to IMG Models who signed her immediately. Her debut fashion show was for Proenza Schouler which she opened. She also walked for also walked for Hugo Boss, Loewe, and Marni in her first season.

References 

Living people

2001 births
American female models
Female models from New York (state)
People from Long Island
People from Great Neck, New York
Jewish female models
Cornell University alumni
IMG Models models
American people of Israeli descent